Necessary Illusions: Thought Control in Democratic Societies is a 1989 book by United States academic Noam Chomsky concerning political power using propaganda to distort and distract from major issues to maintain confusion and complicity, preventing real democracy from becoming effective. The title of this book borrows a phrase from the writings of Reinhold Niebuhr.

Nearly the entire first half of the book is based on Chomsky's five 1988 Massey Lectures on Canadian Broadcasting Corporation Radio from November 1988 and extends his and Edward S. Herman's propaganda model to a variety of new situations.  The remaining appendices address criticisms of the work and provide additional detail.

As a genre of political thought, parallels exist between Niebuhr's "necessary illusions" and the "noble lies" of Plato and Leo Strauss, "public relations" of Edward Bernays and "myth making" of Niccolò Machiavelli.  Likewise, Chomsky's analyses in Necessary Illusions represent a refocus on the use of these patterns of power, which he implies to underscore the failure of populations – particularly in a representative democracy – to learn from history in this regard.

See also
 John Taylor Gatto: The Underground History of American Education
 Adam Curtis: Century of the Self

1989 non-fiction books
Books by Noam Chomsky
Books about propaganda
Books about media bias
Books about public opinion
Books about foreign relations of the United States
Books critical of Zionism
Massey Lectures books